The natives of Mailu: Preliminary results of the Robert Mond research work in British New Guinea is a 1915 anthropological book by the Polish scholar Bronisław Malinowski. It was is second book.

The book was originally published in 1915 in the Transactions and Proceedings of the Royal Society of South Australia. It initially didn't garner much academic attention, but was revisited later, as Malinowski became seen as one of the world's leading anthropologists. The book, edited by Michael Young, was republished in 1988 as Malinowski Among the Magi. "The Natives of Mailu".

References

External links 
 Full text of The Natives of Mailu at HathiTrust Digital Library

1915 non-fiction books
Anthropology books
Papua New Guinean culture
Books by Bronisław Malinowski